Qué bonito amor (International Title:Beautiful Love, Literally:What a Beautiful Love) is a Mexican telenovela produced by Salvador Mejía Alexandre for Televisa that aired on Canal de las Estrellas from October 22, 2012 to June 2, 2013. It is based on La Hija del Mariachi, produced by Colombian's RCN Television and written by Mónica Agudelo in 2006-2007. Production of Qué bonito amor officially started on August 9, 2012. In the United States the telenovela aired on Univision from April 15, 2013 to October 4, 2013.

Jorge Salinas, Danna García and Pablo Montero star as the protagonists, while Malillany Marin, Roberto Palazuelos, Marcelo Buquet, and Salvador Pineda star as the antagonists.

Plot
It is a love story like there is no other, which not only encompasses the most endearing Mexican traditions, but also ennobles one of the most representative icons from its culture: mariachi music. The story begins when we meet Santos Martinez de la Garza, a young handsome and carefree millionaire, who owns a car distributor company. Santos is deceived by his closest partners; one of them is Bruno, his friend and his sister's boyfriend, Wendy. After being accused of fraud and money laundering, Santos is compelled to escape from Los Angeles to Mexico, like a fugitive.

This situation forces him to get a new personality: Jorge Alfredo Vargas, Mariachi.   At the same time, we meet Maria Mendoza, a humble, pretty and brave young girl who lives with her mother, Amalia, a widow; and her two younger sisters, Paloma, who is about to turn 15, and Isabel 8 years old. Ever since Pedro her father died, Maria has had to work in order to help her family get ahead in life because Amalia suffers from a degenerative disease, so Maria is the only support her family has.   Santos and Maria meet at the "Ay Jalisco, no te rajes, bar", where Maria works as a ranchero music singer. It is there in the bar where they both find love for the first time. And it is also in the "Ay Jalisco, no te rajes", run by Don Concho and his wife Lourdes, where the sweetest, saddest, most touching, comic and dramatic situations of the story will take place, together with Maria's inseparable friends who are members of the bar's mariachi band: "The Giant", Fernando: "The Casanova", who will turn into Santos´ confident and allied, "The Dreamer", "Susanito", "The Baritone", "The Adventurer " and "The Sparrow Hawk".

But there will be many tunes, chords, and conflicting forces within Santos and Maria's love story. Santos will face Ruben del Olmo, a powerful and cheating business man who is married but obsessed with Maria's love; and "The Giant", Maria's eternal pretender, who will always fight for her against Santos until the rivalry between them becomes a friendship. On the other hand, Maria will deal with Elvira's lies and tricks, Don Concho's daughter, who by whim and at any cost will not rest until she can have Santos.   And of course, the saddest of all songs: Santos´ identity uncovered, the jail and the separation from his one and only love: Maria, his beautiful. A story full of ranchero music, mariachis, tequila, color, but most of all, full of hopes and dreams that will make us all sing: "¡What a Beautiful Love!"

Cast

Main 

 Jorge Salinas as Santos Martínez de la Garza Treviño / Jorge Alfredo Vargas
 Danna García as  María Mendoza García de Martínez de la Garza
 Pablo Montero as Óscar Fernández "El Coloso"
 Juan Ferrara as Justo Martínez de la Garza
 Angélica María as Amalia García de Mendoza
 Roberto Palazuelos as Giuliano Rina
 Víctor Noriega as Michael Johnson
 Malillany Marín as Elvira Hernández
 Karla Álvarez as Irasema
 Arturo Peniche as Fernando Beltrán "El Mil Amores"

Secondary 
 Salvador Pineda as Don Concepción "Concho" Hernández
 Roberto Ballesteros as Comandante Leonardo "Leo" Derecho
 Rosita Pelayo as Teniente Samantha Curtis
 Fernando Robles as Comandante Malo 
 Moisés Suarez as Escudriño #1
 Ricardo Mansur as Escudriño #2
 Mónica Sánchez Navarro as Altagracia Treviño de Martínez de la Garza
 Paty Diaz as Mirna Reynoso
 Miguel Ángel Biaggio as Susano "Susanito" Sánchez
 Mariana Ríos as Ana López
 Susana Diazayas as Wendy Martínez de la Garza Treviño
 Ivonne Ley as Leticia Letty
 Víctor Reséndez "Latin Lover" as Jairo "El Aventurero"
 Mariano Palacios as Natalio Molina "El Soñador"
 Rafael Negrete as Genaro "El Barítono" 
 Alejandro Ruiz as "El Siete Mares"
 Gabriel Navarro as "El Búfalo"
 Thelma Dorantes as Mancia Sanchez
 Renata Notni as Paloma Mendoza García
 Jesus Daniel González as Rodrigo Fernández Reyes 
 Dayaceli Cervantes as Vanessa
 Karyme Hernàndez as Isabel Mendoza García
 Luis Enrique González as Vicente "El Jalisquito" 
 Homero Ferruzca as Homero
 Carlos Ignacio as Leonel "Pichi" Velásquez
 Ninón Sevilla† as Doña Remedios
 Raul Padilla "Choforo"† as Rigoberto Guerra
 Evita Muñoz "Chachita"† as Doña Prudencia
 Raul Izaguirre as Don Braulio 
 Pietro Vannucci as Fabian

Recurring 
 Manuel Ojeda as Vittoriano Trusco "El Padrino"
 Rogelio Guerra as Carl Summers

Guest Starring 
 Marcelo Buquet as Rubén del Olmo
 Lina Santos as Lourdes de Hernández
 Sergio Mayer as Bruno Morelli
 Eugenia Cauduro as Gloria Reyes
 Alexander Holtmann as Arnold Smith
 Daniela Romo as herself 
 Adán Allende as Aaron
 Pilar Montenegro as Wanda Mey
 Verónica Montes as Susan Davis

References

External links 

Mexican telenovelas
Televisa telenovelas
2012 telenovelas
2012 Mexican television series debuts
2013 Mexican television series endings
2010s Mexican television series
Mexican television series based on Colombian television series
Spanish-language telenovelas